Antonio Vilaplana Molina (28 February 1926 – 14 January 2010) was the Catholic bishop of the Diocese of León, Spain.

Ordained on 18 December 1949, Vilaplana Molina was appointed bishop of the Roman Catholic Diocese of Plasencia on 17 September 1976, and he was ordained on 31 October 1976. On 9 February 1987, he was appointed bishop of the Diocese of León, retiring on 19 March 2002. Vilaplana Molina died of renal failure on 14 January 2010.

Notes

1926 births
2010 deaths
Bishops of León
Deaths from kidney failure